Meadowhall can refer to:

Meadowhall, an area of Sheffield
Meadowhall Interchange, a railway station, tram and bus stop in Sheffield
Meadow Hall and Wincobank railway station, a disused railway station in Sheffield
Meadowhall Shopping Centre, a shopping centre in Sheffield
Wincobank and Meadow Hall, a disused railway station in Sheffield